Sinduri is a small village near by 10 km from Neelkanth Mahadev Temple  in Pauri Garhwal district in Uttarakhand. This village is also known as Sundar Nagar. Mainly there live 4 different castes of people Bhatt, Belwal, Juglan and Barthwal. Due to lack of road connectivity and drinking water problems, most of the villagers have now moved to cities.

Villages in Pauri Garhwal district